Morphett is a single-member electoral district for the South Australian House of Assembly. The electorate is located approximately  slightly south of west of the Adelaide city centre, bounded by the Holdfast Bay coastline to the west and Marion Road to the east.

Created in 1976 following the electoral redistribution which took effect from the 1977 election, the electoral district was named after Sir John Morphett (1809–1892) who lived in the Morphettville area and was speaker of the enlarged Legislative Council in 1851, and president of the elected Legislative Council from 1865 to 1873.

On its creation, Morphett was a notionally marginal Liberal electorate. However, it was won by the Dunstan Labor government in its landslide 1977 election victory, and was Labor's only marginal seat. The Liberals won it at the 1979 election and have held it ever since. The Liberal hold on the electorate was considerably strengthened when the safe Liberal seat of Glenelg was abolished at the 1983 redistribution and largely merged with Morphett.

Duncan McFetridge resigned from the Liberal Party and moved to the crossbench as an independent in May 2017 after losing Liberal pre-selection for Morphett to City of Holdfast Bay mayor Stephen Patterson ahead of the 2018 election. Patterson was successful at the election.

Members for Morphett

Election results

Notes

References
 ECSA profile for Morphett: 2018
 ABC profile for Morphett: 2018
 Poll Bludger profile for Morphett: 2018

1977 establishments in Australia
Electoral districts of South Australia